Newcastle Museum is in Newcastle, New South Wales, Australia.

History 
The Newcastle Museum was founded in 1988. It was originally located in the old Castlemaine Brewery building on Hunter Street until 2008.

Permanent exhibitions 
 A Newcastle Story, early Aboriginal life and Newcastle's history
 Fire and Earth, coal mining and BHP steel production
 Supernova & Mininova, a hands-on science centre

Location 
 Opposite the building: NUspace, University of Newcastle
 Opposite the building: Civic Hub www.CivicHub.com.au
 Opposite the light rail station: Civic station

References

External links 

 

1988 establishments in Australia
Museums established in 1988
Museums in New South Wales
Tourist attractions in Newcastle, New South Wales
Science museums in Australia
Steam museums
Technology museums in Australia
Museum